The Kénédougou Kingdom, (Cebaara Senufo: Fǎngi Kenedugu)also referred to as the Kenedugu Kingdom, (c. 1650–1898) was a pre-colonial West African state established in the southern portion of present-day Mali.

Traoré Dynasty
Kénédougou was first established in the 1650s by the Senoufo people, who originate in modern-day Cote d'Ivoire.  They began traversing the borders of Cote d'Ivoire, Mali, Burkina Faso and Ghana around the 13th century.  The new kingdom was conveniently centered on the border of Mali and Burkina Faso. Its position was crucial to the exchange of desert and forest goods. However, the Senoufo traditionalist practices put them at odds with the Muslims to their north. The Senoufo of Kenedougou adopted some Mandé practices such as the king title of faama. Nanka Traoré became Kénédougou's first ruler and began the Traoré dynasty, which would last into the late 19th century.

There is little information about the kingdom's formative years, and approximately five to seven famas ruled between the foundation of the dynasty and Fama Douala ba I. Kénédougou's existence was marked by relative peace compared to neighboring states of the period.

Kénédougou's Resistance
This would all come to an end in the last quarter of the 19th century as the double threat of French colonialists and Samori Toure began swallowing up its commercial partners in the south, west and east. Possibly anticipating the inevitable outcome, Faama Tieba moved the capital of the kingdom to his mother's home city of Sikasso in 1877. There he built a new palace called the Mamelon on a strategic hill. The decision proved wise, as Tieba and his successor Babemba Traoré fought a number of battles against both Samori Toure and the rapidly advancing French army.

Ironically, the small kingdom of Kénédougou would become one of the last major hold-outs against French ambitions in West Africa. The larger states were falling like dominoes to either Samori's Wassulu Empire or the French. Samori attacked Sikasso with an army of 12,000 men in April 1887, but failed to take the city. Then, from 1887 to 1888, the French besieged Sikasso but also met with defeat. In light of these threats, Tieba ordered the construction of a tata, or fortified wall, around the city in 1890. Parts of the tata have become one of present-day Sikasso's major tourist attractions.

Following Tieba's death on January 1, 1893, his brother Babemba Traoré assumed the throne.  He held the French at bay for another five years. In 1897, the French conquered Ségou, the capital of the Kénédougou's northern neighbor, the Toucouleur Empire. This victory renewed the France's ambition toward Sikasso, and they prepared to take the city again determined to avenge the previous disgrace.

French Conquest
The French launched an artillery assault against Sikasso's tata in April 1898, and the city fell on May 1 of the same year. Rather than see the French take control of his city, Fama Babemba ordered his guards to kill him. The territory of the Kénédougou Kingdom was soon assimilated into the colony of French Sudan, and later into the country of Mali. The memory of Tieba and Babemba are still revered to this day in Mali as symbols of African resistance to the French.

References

Sources
 Pascal James Imperato. Historical Dictionary of Mali. Scarecrow Press/ Metuchen. NJ - London (1986)  pp. 91, 173-74, 214, 237-38, 241
West Africa the Fight for Survival

Countries in precolonial Africa
Political history of Mali
French West Africa